Charlesbank Capital Partners is a private equity investment firm focusing on management-led buyouts and growth capital financing of middle-market companies. The firm typically invests $50 million to $250 million of equity per transaction in companies with enterprise values of $150 million to $1.5 billion. Charlesbank's strategy emphasizes investing across a broad range of industries, transaction types and levels of the capital structure. With the addition of a credit strategy in 2016, the firm also engages in opportunistic or special situations credit investing.

The founders of Charlesbank came together in 1991 as Harvard Private Capital Group to manage the private equity investment portfolio for Harvard Management Company.  In 1998, the founders launched Charlesbank Capital Partners, an independent firm also based in Boston, Massachusetts. The firm employs more than 65 people between its Boston and New York City offices and has over $5 billion of capital under management.

In 2000, the firm raised ~$600 million for Charlesbank Equity Fund V, its first fund to include outside institutional investors. Subsequent funds include Charlesbank Equity Fund VI ($1 billion raised in 2005), Charlesbank Equity Fund VII (~$1.5 billion raised in 2009), Charlesbank Equity Fund VIII (~$1.75 billion raised in 2014) and Charlesbank Equity Fund IX (~$2.75 billion raised in 2017) The firm's founders include co-chairmen Michael R. Eisenson and Kim Davis as well as Tim Palmer, Mark Rosen and Michael Thonis, who now serve as Senior Advisors.  Charlesbank is currently led by managing directors Sam Bartlett, Darren Battistoni, Joshua Beer, Ryan Carroll, Michael Choe (CEO), Sandor Hau, Andrew Janower, Joshua Klevens, Hiren Mankodi, Stephanie Pare Sullivan and Brandon White.

See also 
Nantucket Nectars

References

External links
Charlesbank Capital Partners (company website)

Private equity firms of the United States
Harvard University
Companies based in Massachusetts
Financial services companies established in 1991
1991 establishments in Massachusetts